Eutreta frosti is a species of tephritid or fruit flies in the genus Eutreta of the family Tephritidae.

Distribution
Ecuador.

References

Tephritinae
Insects described in 1938
Diptera of North America